Elections to Chorley Borough Council were held on 3 May 2007.  One third of the council was up for election and the Conservative party retained overall control.

After the election, the composition of the council was:

Election result

Results Map

Ward results

Adlington and Anderton ward

Astley and Buckshaw ward

Chisnall ward

Chorley East ward

Chorley North East ward

Chorley North West ward

Chorley South East ward

Chorley South West ward

Clayton le Woods and Whittle-le-Woods ward

Clayton le Woods North ward

Clayton le Woods West and Cuerden

Coppull ward

Eccleston and Mawdesley ward

Euxton South ward

Lostock ward

References

Non-metropolitan Councils electing by thirds 

2007
2007 English local elections
2000s in Lancashire